The 1963–64 WHL season was the 12th season of the Western Hockey League. The San Francisco Seals were the President's Cup champions as they beat the Los Angeles Blades in six games in the final series.

Final Standings 

bold - qualified for playoffs

Playoffs 

The San Francisco Seals win the President's Cup 4 games to 2.

References 

Western Hockey League (1952–1974) seasons
1963–64 in American ice hockey by league
1963–64 in Canadian ice hockey by league